Erich Krempel (18 August 1913 – 26 September 1992) was a German sport shooter who competed in the 1936 Summer Olympics. In 1936 he won the silver medal in the 50 metre pistol event.

References

1913 births
1992 deaths
German male sport shooters
ISSF pistol shooters
Olympic shooters of Germany
Shooters at the 1936 Summer Olympics
Olympic silver medalists for Germany
Olympic medalists in shooting
Medalists at the 1936 Summer Olympics
People from Suhl
Sportspeople from Thuringia
20th-century German people